was a  after Meireki and before Kanbun. This period spanned the years from July 1658 through April 1661.

Change of era
 1658 : The era name was changed to mark a disastrous, great fire in Edo. The previous era ended and a new one commenced in Meireki 4, on the 23rd day of the 7th month.

The source of this era name comes from the Records of the Grand Historian:  "When the common people know their place, then all under heaven is ruled"  (衆民乃定、万国為治)

Events of the Manji era
 1658 (Manji 1): In the aftermath of the Great Mereiki Fire, the shogunate organized four all-samurai, all-Edo firefighting squads.
 1658 (Manji 1): Yanagisawa Yoshiyasu is born. Yoshiyasu will become Shōgun Tsunayoshi's favorite courtier and chief counselor.
 1659 (Manji 2): In Edo, construction begins on the Ryōgoku Bridge (ryogokubashi).
 1660 (Manji 3): Former rōjū Sakai Tadakatsu entered the Buddhist priesthood.

Gallery

Notes

See also
List of Emperors of Japan
Emperor of Japan

References
 Bodart-Bailey, Beatrice. (2006). The Dog Shogun: The Personality and Policies of Tokugawa Tsunayoshi. Honolulu: University of Hawaii Press. ; ;  OCLC 470123491
 McClain, James L., John M. Merriman  and Kaoru Ugawa. (1994). Edo and Paris: Urban Life and the State in the Early Modern Era. Ithaca: Cornell University Press. 
 Nussbaum, Louis Frédéric and Käthe Roth. (2005). Japan Encyclopedia. Cambridge: Harvard University Press. ; OCLC 48943301
 Screech, Timon. (2006). Secret Memoirs of the Shoguns: Isaac Titsingh and Japan, 1779–1822. London: RoutledgeCurzon. ; OCLC 65177072
 Titsingh, Isaac. (1834). Nihon Ōdai Ichiran; ou,  Annales des empereurs du Japon.  Paris: Royal Asiatic Society, Oriental Translation Fund of Great Britain and Ireland. OCLC 5850691

External links
 National Diet Library, "The Japanese Calendar" -- historical overview plus illustrative images from library's collection

Japanese eras
1650s in Japan
1660s in Japan